The Namibian Ministry of Home Affairs (MHA) is a department of the Namibian government. It was established at Namibian independence in 1990, the first minister was Hifikepunye Pohamba who later became Namibia's second president. In 2020, Home Affairs was merged with the Ministry of Safety and Security and renamed Ministry of Home Affairs, Immigration, Safety and Security (MHAISS). The  minister is Albert Kawana.

Beside its functions as interior ministry, MHAISS also oversees the Namibian police and the prisons.

Ministers
All home affairs ministers in chronological order are:

References

External links
Ministry of Home Affairs official website

Home Affairs
Home Affairs
1990 establishments in Namibia